Rhinodoras dorbignyi is a species of thorny catfish found in the Paraná River basin in the countries of Argentina, Bolivia, Brazil, Paraguay and Uruguay.  This species grows to a length of  TL.

Etymology
Named after Alcide Charles Victor Marie Dessalines d'Orbigny.

References 
 

Doradidae
Fish of South America
Fish of Argentina
Fish of Bolivia
Fish of Brazil
Fish of Paraguay
Fish of Uruguay
Taxa named by Rudolf Kner
Fish described in 1855